The Australia women's national cricket team toured India in March 2012. They played against India in three One Day Internationals and five Twenty20 Internationals, winning the ODI series 3–0 and the T20I series 4–1.

Squads

Tour Match: Indian Board President's XI v Australia

WODI Series

1st ODI

2nd ODI

3rd ODI

WT20I Series

1st T20I

2nd T20I

3rd T20I

4th T20I

5th T20I

References

External links
Australia Women tour of India 2011/12 from Cricinfo

International cricket competitions in 2012
2012 in women's cricket
Women's international cricket tours of India
Australia women's national cricket team tours